Surry County is the name of two counties in the United States:

 Surry County, North Carolina
 Surry County, Virginia

See also
 Surrey